Snake Creek is a stream in the U.S. state of Tennessee. It is a tributary to the Tennessee River.

Snake Creek was named for its serpentine meanders.

References

Rivers of Hardin County, Tennessee
Rivers of McNairy County, Tennessee
Rivers of Tennessee